Kerz is an unincorporated community in Johnson County, Kentucky, United States. It is located at an elevation of 843 feet (257 m). Its ZIP code is 41255.

References

Unincorporated communities in Johnson County, Kentucky
Unincorporated communities in Kentucky